The 1936 United States presidential election in Indiana took place on November 3, 1936, as part of the 1936 United States presidential election. State voters chose 14 representatives, or electors, to the Electoral College, who voted for president and vice president.

Indiana was won by incumbent President Franklin D. Roosevelt (D–New York), running with Vice President John Nance Garner of Texas, with 56.63% of the popular vote, against Governor Alf Landon (R–Kansas), running with businessman Frank Knox of Illinois, with 41.89% of the popular vote. , this is the last election in which Boone County, Rush County, Union County and Wayne County voted for a Democratic presidential candidate. Indiana has only voted for the Democratic candidate twice since this election, in 1964 and in 2008. This marks the only time since 1856 that Indiana has voted Democratic in consecutive presidential elections.

Results

Results by county

See also
 United States presidential elections in Indiana

References

Indiana
1936
1936 Indiana elections